Sarab Rural District may refer to:
 Sarab Rural District (Hamadan Province)
 Sarab Rural District (Ilam Province)
 Sarab Rural District (Kermanshah Province)

See also
 Sarab Bagh Rural District